This is a list of Armenian boxers.

William Abelyan 
Alexander Abraham 
Arthur Abraham 
Araik Ambartsumov 
Roman Aramian
Alexander Awdijan 
David Ayrapetyan
Hovhannes Danielyan 
Vic Darchinyan
Khoren Gevor
Artur Gevorgyan 
Mekhak Ghazaryan 
Artur Grigorian
Andranik Hakobyan 
Eduard Hambardzumyan 
Artyom Hovanessyan
Hrachik Javakhyan
Susianna Kentikian
Leva Kirakosyan 
Kirkor Kirkorov
Tom Bradbury
David Lemieux
Artak Malumyan
Arsen Martirosian 
Vanes Martirosyan 
Nshan Munchyan
Victor Oganov 
Bagrat Oghanian
Lernik Papyan
Aram Ramazyan
Vazgen Safaryants
David Torosyan
Vladimir Yengibaryan

References

 https://web.archive.org/web/20150811212928/http://armboxing.am/index.php?page=athletes

External links 
 

 
Boxers
Lists of boxers by nationality